Ette is a river of Baden-Württemberg, Germany. It flows into the Jagst near Mulfingen. Including its source river Eselsbach, it is 14 km long.

See also
List of rivers of Baden-Württemberg

References

Rivers of Baden-Württemberg
Rivers of Germany